Le grand chemin is a 1987 French film directed by Jean-Loup Hubert. It was released in the U.S. as The Grand Highway, and was remade in 1991 as Paradise.

It won the César Award for Best Actor and Best Actress.

Plot 
Louis, a timid nine-year-old boy from Paris, spends his summer vacation in a small town in Brittany. His mother Claire has lodged him with her girlfriend Marcelle and her husband Pelo while she is having her second baby. There Louis makes friends with Martine, the ten-year-old girl next door, and learns about life from her. His subsequent adventures run the gamut from delightful to terrifying, with a little "coming of age" (via a few glimpses of nudity) thrown in.

Cast 
Richard Bohringer – Pelo
Anémone – Marcelle
Antoine Hubert – Louis
Christine Pascal – Claire
Pascale Roberts – Yvonne
Vanessa Guedj – Martine

Production 
Le grand chemin was directed by Jean-Loup Hubert, and produced by Pascal Hommais and Jean Francois Lepetit. The film was released in the U.S. as The Grand Highway, in French with English subtitles. Claude Lecomte served as director of photography, with camera operator Jean Paul Meurisse and film editor Raymonde Guyot. The musical score was composed by Georges Granier; the original soundtrack music was reissued in 2013 by Canadian label Disques Cinemusique.

Reception 
Richard Bohringer and Anémone won César Awards for Best Actor and Best Actress. The film was nominated for Best Foreign Language Film of the year by the U.S. National Board of Review.

References

External links 

1987 films
1987 drama films
French drama films
Films about children
Films featuring a Best Actor César Award-winning performance
Films featuring a Best Actress César Award-winning performance
Films set in Brittany
1980s French-language films
1980s French films